La gitanilla ("the little Gypsy girl") is a 1924 French drama film directed by André Hugon. It is based on the short story "La gitanilla", from the collection Novelas ejemplares by Miguel de Cervantes. The film was produced through Productions André Hugon. It was released in France on 18 April 1924 through Pathé Consortium Cinéma.

Cast
 Ginette Maddie as la Gitanilla
 Jaime Devesa as Andrès Caballero
 Jeanne Bérangère as Dolorès
 José Durany as Antonio
 Léon Courtois as le chef
 Georges Deneubourg as l'Alcade

References

1924 films
1924 drama films
Films about Romani people
Films based on Spanish novels
Films based on works by Miguel de Cervantes
Films directed by André Hugon
French drama films
French silent feature films
1920s French-language films
French black-and-white films
Works based on La gitanilla
Silent drama films
1920s French films